Lau Sek Fong (1929 – 6 May 2017) was a Hong Kong male table tennis player. From 1954 to 1957 he won two gold medals in singles, and team events in the Asian Table Tennis Championships.

See also
 List of table tennis players

References

Hong Kong male table tennis players
1929 births
Place of birth missing
2017 deaths